Gabriel Apolinar Benítez (born June 15, 1988) is a Mexican mixed martial artist. He was a contestant on The Ultimate Fighter: Latin America 1,  and he competes in the featherweight division of the Ultimate Fighting Championship (UFC).

Background 

Benítez was born in Tijuana, Mexico and started training in mixed martial arts when he was 18 years old.

Mixed martial arts career

Early career 
Benítez started his professional MMA career in 2007, making his debut in his home country Mexico and he amassed a record of 16-4 prior to signing with the UFC.

The Ultimate Fighter: Latin America 1 
Benítez was selected as one of the cast members for The Ultimate Fighter: Latin America 1 , UFC The Ultimate Fighter TV series, under Team Cain Velasquez in April 2014.

In elimination round, Benítez submitted Diego Rivas via rear-naked choke in round 2. Benítez next faced Leonardo Morales in the semifinals and he lost by unanimous decision.

Ultimate Fighting Championship 
Benítez made his promotional debut on November 15, 2014 at UFC 180 against Humberto Brown. He won the first UFC win via guillotine choke in round 3.

He next faced Clay Collard on June 13, 2015 at UFC 188. He won via unanimous decision with 30-27 across the board

On his third appearance for UFC fight, Benítez took on Andre Fili on November 21, 2015 at UFC Fight Night: Magny vs. Gastelum.  He lost the fight via KO in round one.

On September 17, 2016, Benítez face Sam Sicilia at UFC Fight Night: Poirier vs. Johnson. He defeated Sicilia via guillotine choke in round two.

Benítez faced Enrique Barzola, the featherweight champion of  “The Ultimate Fighter: Latin America 2, on May 13, 2017 at UFC 211. After three rounds fight, the judges awarded the win to Barzola with 29-28 across the score board.

Benítez faced Jason Knight on December 9, 2017 at UFC Fight Night 123. He won the fight via unanimous decision.

Benítez faced Humberto Bandenay on May 19, 2018 at UFC Fight Night 129. He won the fight via knockout due to a slam and punches just 39 seconds into the first round. This win earned him the Performance of the Night bonus.

Benítez faced Sodiq Yusuff on August 17, 2019 at UFC 241. He lost the fight via knockout in round one.

Benítez was expected to face Lerone Murphy on March 21, 2020 at UFC Fight Night: Woodley vs. Edwards. Due to the COVID-19 pandemic, the event was eventually postponed.

Benítez faced Omar Morales on May 13, 2020 at UFC Fight Night: Smith vs. Teixeira. He lost the fight via unanimous decision.

Benítez was scheduled to face Justin Jaynes on November 14, 2020 at UFC Fight Night: Felder vs. dos Anjos. The fight was canceled after Benítez tested positive for COVID-19. The pairing was left intact and eventually took place on December 5, 2020 at UFC on ESPN 19. He won the fight via technical knockout in the first round. This fight earned him the Performance of the Night award.

Benítez was scheduled to face Jonathan Pearce on May 1, 2021 at UFC on ESPN 23. However, weighing in over 4 pounds during weigh-in, the bout was cancelled.

Benítez faced Billy Quarantillo, replacing Herbert Burns on July 17, 2021 at UFC on ESPN 26. He lost the fight via technical knockout in round three. This win earned him the Fight of the Night award.

Benítez was scheduled to face T.J. Brown on January 15, 2022 at UFC on ESPN 32. Three days before the event, Benítez was forced to pull out and Charles Rosa replaced him with the bout now taking place at Lightweight.

Benítez faced David Onama on February 19, 2022 at UFC Fight Night: Walker vs. Hill. At weigh-ins, Benítez weighed in at 148 pounds, 2 pounds over the featherweight non-title fight limit. The bout proceeded at catchweight and he was fined 30% of his purse. Benítez lost the bout via first round knockout.

Benítez faced Charlie Ontiveros on August 13, 2022 at UFC on ESPN 41. He won the fight via technical knockout in round one.

Benítez was scheduled to face Jim Miller on February 18, 2023, at UFC Fight Night 219.  However, Benítez withdrew due to an undisclosed reason and was replaced by Alexander Hernandez.

Championships and accomplishments

Mixed martial arts 
Ultimate Fighting Championship
Performance of the Night (Two times) vs. Humberto Bandenay and Justin Jaynes
Fight of the Night (One time) 
 Ultimate Warrior Challenge
 Ultimate Warrior Challenge Featherweight Champion (One time)
 Xtreme Kombat
 Xtreme Kombat Featherweight Champion (One time) vs. Antonio Ramirez
 Xtreme Fighters Latino
 Xtreme Fighters Latino Featherweight Champion (One time) vs. Daniel Salas
 Xplode Fight Series
 Xplode Fight Series Featherweight Champion (One time) vs. Ryan Bixler

Mixed martial arts record

|-
|Win
|align=center|23–10
|Charlie Ontiveros
|TKO (punches)
|UFC on ESPN: Vera vs. Cruz
|
|align=center|1
|align=center|3:35
|San Diego, California, United States
|
|-
|Loss
|align=center|22–10
|David Onama
|KO (punches)
|UFC Fight Night: Walker vs. Hill
|
|align=center|1
|align=center|4:24
|Las Vegas, Nevada, United States
|
|-
|Loss
|align=center|22–9
|Billy Quarantillo
|TKO (punches)
|UFC on ESPN: Makhachev vs. Moisés
|
|align=center|3
|align=center|3:40
|Las Vegas, Nevada, United States
|
|-
|Win
|align=center|22–8
|Justin Jaynes
|TKO (knee to the body and elbows)
|UFC on ESPN: Hermansson vs. Vettori
|
|align=center|1
|align=center|4:06
|Las Vegas, Nevada, United States
|
|-
|Loss
|align=center|21–8
|Omar Morales
|Decision (unanimous)
|UFC Fight Night: Smith vs. Teixeira
|
|align=center|3
|align=center|5:00
|Jacksonville, Florida, United States
||
|-
|Loss
|align=center|21–7
|Sodiq Yusuff
|TKO (punches)
|UFC 241 
|
|align=center|1
|align=center|4:14
|Anaheim, California, United States
|
|- 
|Win
|align=center|21–6
|Humberto Bandenay
|KO (slam)
|UFC Fight Night: Maia vs. Usman
|
|align=center|1
|align=center|0:39
|Santiago, Chile
|
|-
|Win
| align=center|20–6
| Jason Knight
| Decision (unanimous)
| UFC Fight Night: Swanson vs. Ortega 
| 
| align=center| 3
| align=center| 5:00
| Fresno, California, United States
|
|-
| Loss
| align=center| 19–6
| Enrique Barzola
| Decision (unanimous)
| UFC 211
| 
| align=center| 3
| align=center| 5:00
| Dallas, Texas, United States
|
|-
| Win
| align=center| 19–5
| Sam Sicilia
| Technical Submission (guillotine choke)
| UFC Fight Night: Poirier vs. Johnson
| 
| align=center| 2
| align=center| 1:20
| Hidalgo, Texas, United States
|
|-
| Loss
| align=center| 18–5
| Andre Fili
| KO (head kick and punches)
| The Ultimate Fighter Latin America 2 Finale: Magny vs. Gastelum
| 
| align=center| 1
| align=center| 3:13
| Monterrey, Mexico
| 
|-
| Win
| align=center| 18–4
| Clay Collard
| Decision (unanimous)
| UFC 188
| 
| align=center| 3
| align=center| 5:00
| Mexico City, Mexico
|
|-
| Win
| align=center| 17–4
| Humberto Brown
| Technical Submission (guillotine choke)
| UFC 180
| 
| align=center| 3
| align=center| 0:30
| Mexico City, Mexico
|
|-
| Win
| align=center| 16–4
| Angelo Sanchez
| Decision (unanimous)
| Orthrus Promotions: Triple A MMA 5
| 
| align=center| 3
| align=center| 5:00
| Albuquerque, New Mexico, United States
|
|-
| Win
| align=center| 15–4
| Rey Trujillo
| TKO (punches)
| Fresquez Productions: Havoc
| 
| align=center| 2
| align=center| 3:25
| Albuquerque, New Mexico, United States
|
|-
| Loss
| align=center| 14–4
| Richard Villa
| Submission (heel hook)
| Jackson's MMA Series 11
| 
| align=center| 1
| align=center| 0:52
| Albuquerque, New Mexico, United States
|
|-
| Loss
| align=center| 14–3
| Rigo Oropeza
| Submission (guillotine choke)
| Ultimate Warrior Challenge Mexico 13
| 
| align=center| 1
| align=center| 0:19
| Tijuana, Mexico
|
|-
| Win
| align=center| 14–2
| Antonio Ramirez
| KO (punches)
| Xtreme Kombat 17
| 
| align=center| 1
| align=center| 1:48
| Mexico City, Mexico
|
|-
| Win
| align=center| 13–2
| Ryan Bixler
| TKO (punches)
| Xplode Fight Series: Hunted
| 
| align=center| 1
| align=center| 1:24
| Valley Center, California, United States
|
|-
| Win
| align=center| 12–2
| Jorge Lopez
| Submission (rear-naked choke)
| Ultimate Warrior Challenge Mexico 12
| 
| align=center| 2
| align=center| 3:12
| Tijuana, Mexico
|
|-
| Win
| align=center| 11–2
| Daniel Salas
| Decision (unanimous)
| Xtreme Fighters Latino
| 
| align=center| 5
| align=center| 5:00
| Mexico City, Mexico
|
|-
| Win
| align=center| 10–2
| Raul Bellereza
| Submission (rear-naked choke)
| Ultimate Warrior Challenge Mexico 9
| 
| align=center| 1
| align=center| 3:29
| Tijuana, Mexico
|
|-
| Win
| align=center| 9–2
| Manuel Ramos Gallareta
| Submission (kimura)
| Ultimate Warrior Challenge Mexico 5
| 
| align=center| 1
| align=center| 1:03
| Tijuana, Mexico
|
|-
| Win
| align=center| 8–2
| Tito Castro
| TKO (punches)
| Ultimate Warrior Challenge Mexico 4
| 
| align=center| 2
| align=center| 2:15
| Tijuana, Mexico
|
|-
| Win
| align=center| 7–2
| Shawn Major
| Submission (armbar)
| Ultimate Challenge Mexico 12
| 
| align=center| 1
| align=center| 0:39
| Tijuana, Mexico
|
|-
| Win
| align=center| 6–2
| Shawn Major
| TKO (doctor stoppage)
| Ultimate Warrior Challenge Mexico 2
| 
| align=center| 1
| align=center| 2:13
| Tijuana, Mexico
|
|-
| Win
| align=center| 5–2
| Kyle Olsen
| Submission (guillotine choke)
| Ultimate Warrior Challenge Mexico 1
| 
| align=center| 1
| align=center| 1:24
| Tijuana, Mexico
|
|-
| Loss
| align=center| 4–2
| Yaotzin Meza
| Decision (unanimous)
| Noche de Gladiadores
| 
| align=center| 3
| align=center| 3:00
| Hermosillo, Mexico
|
|-
| Win
| align=center| 4–1
| Alan Mar
| Submission (guillotine choke)
| Ultimate Challenge Mexico 6
| 
| align=center| 3
| align=center| 2:04
| Tijuana, Mexico
|
|-
| Win
| align=center| 3–1
| Dominic Gutierrez
| Submission (armbar)
| Tijuana Municipal Sports Institute: No Way Out
| 
| align=center| 1
| align=center| 2:31
| Tijuana, Mexico
|
|-
| Loss
| align=center| 2–1
| Emilio Chavez
| Decision (unanimous)
| Cage of Fire 10
| 
| align=center| 3
| align=center| 5:00
| Mexico
|
|-
| Win
| align=center| 2–0
| Tomas Huerta
| KO (punches)
| Ultimate Challenge Mexico 4
| 
| align=center| 1
| align=center| 0:00
| Tijuana, Mexico
|
|-
| Win
| align=center| 1–0
| Martin Perez
| Submission (armbar)
| Ultimate Challenge Mexico 2
| 
| align=center| 2
| align=center| 0:00
| Tijuana, Mexico
|
|-

See also
 List of current UFC fighters
 List of male mixed martial artists

References

External links
 
 

Living people
1988 births
Mexican male mixed martial artists
Featherweight mixed martial artists
Mixed martial artists utilizing boxing
Mixed martial artists utilizing Brazilian jiu-jitsu
Sportspeople from Tijuana
Ultimate Fighting Championship male fighters
Mexican practitioners of Brazilian jiu-jitsu